is a Japanese voice actor, narrator, and DJ who is affiliated with OYS Planning & Produce.

Notable roles

Anime

2002

 Digimon Frontier (Man)

2003

 Zatch Bell (Blizzard Thing, Lance)

2004

 Futari wa Pretty Cure (Football Staff)

2006

 Futari wa Precure Splash Star (Naoto Nikaido)
 Digimon: Data Squad (Group members)
 Air Gear (Saber Tiger)
 Hataraki Man (Itoh)

2007
 Yes! Precure 5 (Tiger)

Video Games

2004
 Zatch Bell! Mamodo Fury (Lance)

External links
Jun Azumi's profile on OYS Planning (Japanese)

Living people
Japanese male voice actors
Year of birth missing (living people)